2014 Italian Athletics Indoor Championships was the 45th edition of the Italian Athletics Indoor Championships and were held in Ancona.

Champions

Women

Men

See also
2013 Italian Athletics Championships

References

External links
 FIDAL web site

Italian Athletics Championships
Athletics
Italian Athletics Indoor Championships